Natipong Srithong (born 1 October 1993) is a Thai professional golfer.

Amateur career
As an amateur, Srithong won two tournaments in Asia. He also competed in several multi-sport events winning the following medals:

Professional career
Srithong turned professional in 2015 and began playing on the Asian Tour, winning the Resorts World Manila Masters in November.

Amateur wins
2011 Indonesia Amateur Open, Singha Thailand Open

Source:

Professional wins (1)

Asian Tour wins (1)

Team appearances
Amateur
Southeast Asian Games (representing Thailand): 2011 (winners), 2013 (winners)
Bonallack Trophy (representing Asia/Pacific): 2012
Asian Games (representing Thailand): 2014

References

External links

Natipong Srithong
Asian Tour golfers
Asian Games medalists in golf
Natipong Srithong
Golfers at the 2014 Asian Games
Medalists at the 2014 Asian Games
Southeast Asian Games medalists in golf
Natipong Srithong
Natipong Srithong
Competitors at the 2011 Southeast Asian Games
Competitors at the 2013 Southeast Asian Games
Competitors at the 2015 Southeast Asian Games
Universiade medalists in golf
Universiade bronze medalists for Thailand
Medalists at the 2015 Summer Universiade
1993 births
Living people